George Daniel Chafee (July 2, 1839 – March 6, 1927) was an American politician and lawyer.

Chafee was born in Pittsford, Vermont. He moved with his family to Monroe County, Michigan. Chafee graduated from University of Michigan with his law degree. Chafee then moved to Shelbyville, Illinois, in 1861, to practice law. During the American Civil War, Chafee served on the local draft board. Chafee served in the Illinois House of Representatives in 1881 and 1882 and was a Republican. He also served in the Illinois Senate from 1905 to 1909. Chafee died at his home in Shelbyville, Illinois.

Notes

External links

1839 births
1927 deaths
People from Pittsford, Vermont
People from Shelbyville, Illinois
People of Illinois in the American Civil War
University of Michigan Law School alumni
Illinois lawyers
Republican Party members of the Illinois House of Representatives
Republican Party Illinois state senators
19th-century American lawyers